Salt Draw is a river in Texas. On April 4, 2004 flash flooding of Salt Draw caused the failure of a protective levee around Toyah, Texas, extensive flooding of most homes and property in Toyah, and the destruction of the Interstate 20 bridge over Salt Draw between Toyah and Pecos, Texas in Reeves County. Indirectly, 5 lives were also lost in a weather related traffic accident on U.S. Route 285 south of Pecos, which was being used as a detour because of the bridge failure.

Jeannette Walls' grandmother Lily lived from 1901 until 1911 in a dugout at Salt Draw which is described in the 2009 novel Half Broke Horses.

See also
List of rivers of Texas

Links
Salt Draw Watershed at epa.gov

USGS Geographic Names Information Service
USGS Hydrologic Unit Map - State of Texas (1974)
References

Rivers of Texas